Azadistan was a short-lived state in the Iranian province of Azarbaijan under leadership of Mohammad Khiabani.

Azadistan may also refer to:

 Azadistan, the name of a fictional country from the Japanese anime television series, Mobile Suit Gundam 00.